Holy Trinity School or Holy Trinity Catholic School may refer to:

Canada
Holy Trinity School (Richmond Hill), Ontario

India
Holy Trinity School, Allahabad, Uttar Pradesh; affiliated with Boys' High School & College
Holy Trinity School, Kanjikode, Kerala

United Kingdom
Holy Trinity School, Crawley, West Sussex, England
Holy Trinity School, Kidderminster, Worcestershire, England
Holy Trinity School, Guildford, Surrey, England

United States
Holy Trinity Catholic School, Birmingham, Alabama
Holy Trinity Catholic Schools, headquartered in Fort Madison, Iowa
Holy Trinity School (Washington, D.C.)

See also
Holy Trinity Catholic and Church of England School, Barnsley, South Yorkshire, England
Holy Trinity (disambiguation)
Holy Trinity Academy (disambiguation)
Holy Trinity Catholic High School (disambiguation)
Holy Trinity College (disambiguation)
Holy Trinity High School (disambiguation)